XHTSCO-TDT, physical channel 36 and virtual channel 10, is a television station in Saltillo, Coahuila. The station is owned by Grupo Zócalo and is known as Tele Saltillo. The station broadcasts from studios co-located with the Zócalo newspaper and a transmitter on Calle Allende.

History
XHTSCO was awarded in the IFT-6 TV station auction of 2017 to Tele Saltillo, a subsidiary of Grupo Zócalo. Zócalo initially announced it would sign on the station on June 13, 2018, to coincide with ten years of the Zócalo newspaper in Saltillo.

The transmitter was turned on in October 2018, with Milenio Televisión programming airing until Tele Saltillo launched at 5:30 am on December 17, 2018. Tele Saltillo's affiliation with Milenio builds on a longstanding relationship between Grupo Zócalo and Multimedios Televisión.

Subchannels
Tele Saltillo carries timeshifted channels on its .2, .3 and .4 channels.

References 

2018 establishments in Mexico
Television channels and stations established in 2018
Television stations in Coahuila
Independent television stations in Mexico